Liu Du was a government official and minor warlord who lived during the Eastern Han dynasty of China.

Life
Liu Du served as the Administrator of Lingling Commandery (零陵郡; around present-day Yongzhou, Hunan).

In 209, the warlord Liu Bei led his forces to conquer the four commanderies in southern Jing Province: Wuling, Changsha, Guiyang, and Lingling. Liu Du surrendered to Liu Bei along with the Administrators of the other three commanderies.

In Romance of the Three Kingdoms
In the 14th-century historical novel Romance of the Three Kingdoms, Liu Du has a son, Liu Xian, whom he at one point sends along with Xing Daorong (also a fictional character) against Liu Bei. However, Liu Du surrenders when hearing of the defeat of Liu Xian.

See also
 Lists of people of the Three Kingdoms

References

 Chen, Shou (3rd century). Records of the Three Kingdoms (Sanguozhi).
 Luo, Guanzhong (14th century). Romance of the Three Kingdoms (Sanguo Yanyi).
 Pei, Songzhi (5th century). Annotations to Records of the Three Kingdoms (Sanguozhi zhu).

2nd-century births
Year of death unknown
Liu Biao and associates
Han dynasty warlords
Officials under Liu Bei
Political office-holders in Hunan